The National Collegiate Athletic Association (Philippines) swimming tournament is held every August during the year-long NCAA season.

The championship is determined by the total number of points accumulated by a team, by virtue by the placements in the final rounds (similar to the method used in the General Championship.

Champions

Number of championships by school

Note
 LSGH has won six (6) championships under DLSU and thirteen (13) championships under CSB.

References

Champions list at the official NCAA Philippines website
Presidents and hosts list at the official NCAA Philippines website

See also
 UAAP Swimming Championship

College swimming
Swimming
National swimming competitions